Svinica may refer to:

Svinica, Croatia, a village in Croatia
Svinica, Košice-okolie District, a village and municipality in Slovakia
Świnica, a mountain on Polish-Slovak border